The 2023 NCAA Division I Indoor Track and Field Championships will be the 58th NCAA Division I Men's Indoor Track and Field Championships and the 41st NCAA Division I Women's Indoor Track and Field Championships, to be held at the Albuquerque Convention Center in Albuquerque, New Mexico, on the indoor track. The field will consist of 17 different men's and women's indoor track and field events with a total of 650 participants contested from March 10 to March 11, 2023.

Streaming and TV coverage
ESPN streamed the event on ESPN+. On March 12, a replay of the championships was broadcast at 9 P.M. Eastern Time on ESPNU.

Results

Men's results

60 meters
Final results shown, not prelims

200 meters
Final results shown, not prelims

400 meters
Final results shown, not prelims

800 meters
Final results shown, not prelims

Mile
Final results shown, not prelims

3000 meters
Final results shown, not prelims

5000 meters
Final results shown, not prelims

60 meter hurdles
Final results shown, not prelims

4 x 400 meters relay
Final results shown, not prelims

Distance Medley Relay
Final results shown, not prelims

High Jump
Final results shown, not prelims

Pole Vault
Final results shown, not prelims

Long Jump
Final results shown, not prelims

Triple Jump
Final results shown, not prelims

Shot Put
Final results shown, not prelims

Weight Throw
Final results shown, not prelims

Heptathlon
Final results shown, not prelims

Men's team scores
Top 10 and ties shown

Women's results

60 meters
Final results shown, not prelims

200 meters
Final results shown, not prelims

400 meters
Final results shown, not prelims

800 meters
Final results shown, not prelims

Mile
Final results shown, not prelims

3000 meters
Final results shown, not prelims

5000 meters
Final results shown, not prelims

60 meter hurdles
Final results shown, not prelims

4 x 400 meters relay
Final results shown, not prelims

Distance Medley Relay
Final results shown, not prelims

High Jump
Final results shown, not prelims

Pole Vault
Final results shown, not prelims

Long Jump
Final results shown, not prelims

Triple Jump
Final results shown, not prelims

Weight Throw
Final results shown, not prelims

Shot Put
Final results shown, not prelims

Pentathlon
Final results shown, not prelims

Women's team scores
Top 10 and ties shown

Schedule

See also
National Collegiate Athletic Association (NCAA)
NCAA Men's Division I Indoor Track and Field Championships 
NCAA Women's Division I Indoor Track and Field Championships

References

External links
 Results
 2023 Results
 Athletes List & Admin info
 Schedule

NCAA Division I Indoor Track and Field Championships
NCAA Indoor Track and Field Championships
NCAA Division I Indoor Track and Field Championships
NCAA Division I Indoor Track and Field Championships
College sports in New Mexico
NCAA Division I Indoor Track and Field Championships